Athamanthia phoenicura is a butterfly of the family Lycaenidae. It was described by Julius Lederer in 1870 and is found in Armenia, Turkmenistan, Turkey, Iran, Afghanistan, Pakistan.

The wingspan is 26–28 mm. The species inhabits semi-deserts between 300 and 1400 m above sea level. The host plant of the species is Atraphaxis spinosa. The butterfly flies from May to June.

The larvae have been recorded feeding on Atraphaxis spinosa.

Subspecies
Athamanthia phoenicura phoenicura (Kopet-Dagh)
Athamanthia phoenicura transcaucasica (Miller, 1923) (Armenia, Azerbaijan, north-eastern Turkey)
Athamanthia phoenicura athamantides (Eckweiler & Hagen, 2001) 
Athamanthia phoenicura monalisa (Eckweiler, 2004)

References

External links
 "Athamanthia Zhdanko, 1983" at Markku Savela's Lepidoptera and Some Other Life Forms
 Butterfly Conservation Armenia

Lycaeninae
Butterflies described in 1870
Butterflies of Asia
Taxa named by Julius Lederer